Mexico competed at the 1932 Summer Olympics in Los Angeles, United States. 73 competitors, 71 men and 2 women, took part in 52 events in 12 sports.

Medalists

Athletics

Track & road events
Men

Field events
Men

Women

Boxing

Cycling

Road

Track
Sprint

Diving

Equestrian

Dressage

Eventing

Jumping
The team event was declared void as no nation completed the course with three riders.

Fencing

Men

Women

Gymnastics

Apparatus and all-around events received separate scores.

Indian clubs

Modern pentathlon

Shooting

Swimming

Wrestling

Freestyle

Wrestlers who accumulated 5 "bad points" were eliminated. Points were given as follows: 1 point for victories short of a fall and 3 points for every loss.

Art competitions

Art competitions were part of the Olympic program from 1912 to 1948, but were discontinued due to concerns about amateurism and professionalism. Some artists took part, but the exact event is unknown

References

External links
Official Olympic Reports
International Olympic Committee results database

Nations at the 1932 Summer Olympics
1932
1932 in Mexican sports